This is a comprehensive list of awards won by 2 Guinness record holder reggaeton singer J Balvin. He has won Eleven Billboard Latin Music Awards, six Latin Grammy Awards, five MTV Video Music Awards and six Latin American Music Awards. He is the most nominated Latin artist in history with a total of 35 nominations at the Latin Grammy Awards. He also made his name in the Guinness Book of Records by getting 13 nominations in one night.  He is the only Colombian artist to be awarded 3 times in the best album category, and is in second place overall.

Premios Lo Nuestro recognized J Balvin with the Global Icon Award at for his contribution to spread Latin music worldwide. He is the most awarded Latin artist in the history of MTV Vmas and Emas with 8 awards. also won 7 awards at the MTV Millennial Awards, winning a total of 15 awards from all MTV awards. He is also the most awarded Latin artist at the iHeart Radio awards.

He is also the most awarded Latin artist at the iHeartRadio Music Awards. Awarded 4 iHeartRadio Music Awards along with the accomplishment of reaching 1 Billion Total Audience Spins for “I Like It” (feat Cardi B & Bad Bunny).

Awards and nominations

References

J Balvin